Mukundara Hills National Park is a national park in Rajasthan, India with an area of . It was established in 2004 and consists of three wildlife sanctuaries: Darrah Wildlife Sanctuary, National Chambal Sanctuary, and Jawahar Sagar Wildlife Sanctuary. It is located in the Khathiar-Gir dry deciduous forests.

History
The national park contains large tracts of forests formerly part of the Maharaja of Kota's hunting grounds. The park was embroiled in a political controversy over its nomenclature, when the Bharatiya Janata Party state government revoked the decision that it be called the Rajiv Gandhi National Park.

Wildlife

Mukundara Hills National Park is mountainous and has a variety of plants, trees and animals. It has grasslands in between and also many dry deciduous trees. There are four rivers that flow in this region, the rivers are Chambal river, Kali river, Ahu river, Ramzan river.

Tree species in the forests of Mukundara Hills National Park include Acacia nilotica, Atrocarpus heterophyllus, Aegle marmelos, Azadirachta indica, Bombax ceiba, Breonia (syn. Anthocephalus), Cassia fistula, Citrus aurantifolia, Delonix regia, Dalbergia sissoo, Phyllanthus emblica, Eucalyptus, Ficus religiosa, Ficus glomerata, Ficus benghalensis.

Bengal tiger, the Indian wolf and the Indian leopard are the major carnivores in this reserve. Prey species include the chital, sambar deer, wild boar and the nilgai. Sloth bear and chinkara also inhabit the area. Reptiles include the Mugger crocodile and the gharial.

Asiatic lion reintroduction project

Mukandara Hills National Park was once considered for the reintroduction of the Asiatic lion.

Tiger reintroduction

Mukundra Hills National Park received the first tiger from Ranthambore Tiger Reserve. In July and August 2020, a male and female tiger were discovered dead and probably died in territorial fights. Later, the other male tiger died. The cause of his death is still not known. The last tigress, was discovered with multiple injuries and for her safety, she was translocated to a biological park for treatment. She was put back in Mukundra after laser therapy. She is the last tiger of Mukundra.

See also 
 Arid Forest Research Institute (AFRI)
 Indian Council of Forestry Research and Education
 Jawahar Sagar Dam
 Wildlife of India

References

External links

National parks in Rajasthan
Tourist attractions in Baran district
Protected areas established in 2004
2004 establishments in Rajasthan